Zopfiofoveola is a genus of fungi in the family Zopfiaceae. This is a monotypic genus, containing the single species Zopfiofoveola punctata.

References

External links
Index Fungorum

Pleosporales
Monotypic Dothideomycetes genera
Taxa named by David Leslie Hawksworth